Nazar Andaaz is a 2022 Indian Hindi-language comedy film directed by Vikrant Deshmukh and starring Abhishek Banerjee, Divya Dutta and Kumud Mishra. The film was released on 7 October 2022.

Cast 
 Abhishek Banerjee as Ali
 Divya Dutta as Bhavani
 Kumud Mishra as Sudhir

Production 
The film was announced in March 2022, Kumud Mishra was confirmed to be cast in lead role.

The principal photography of the film started in mid-March 2022.

Soundtrack 

The film's music is composed by Vishal Mishra while the all lyrics are written by Raj Shekhar.

Release 
The film was scheduled to release on 7 October 2022.

Reception

References

External links 
 
 

Indian comedy films
2020s Hindi-language films